Yomiuri Giants Stadium is a baseball stadium in Kawasaki, Kanagawa, Japan. The stadium, which holds 4,000 people, also serves as the training home of the Yomiuri Giants.

The stadium is located within the Yomiuriland Amusement Park, and can be accessed by the Keiō-Yomiuriland Station or the Yomiuriland-mae Station.

External links 
Giants Farm site

Baseball venues in Japan
Sports venues in Kawasaki, Kanagawa
Yomiuri Giants
Sports venues completed in 1985
1985 establishments in Japan